USS Newport may refer to the following ships of the United States Navy:

, was a gunboat that served during the Spanish–American War
, was a Tacoma-class frigate that served during World War II
, was the lead ship of the Newport-class landing ship tank that served during the Cold War

See also
, is a Spearhead-class Expeditionary Fast Transport

United States Navy ship names